Mudhole Assembly constituency is a constituency of Telangana Legislative Assembly, India. It is one of 3 constituencies in Nirmal district. It comes under Adilabad Lok Sabha constituency along with 6 other Assembly constituencies.

Gaddigari Vittal Reddy of Telangana Rashtra Samithi won the seat in 2018 Assembly elections.

Mandals
The Assembly Constituency presently comprises the following Mandals:

Members of Legislative Assembly

Election results

Telangana Legislative Assembly election, 2018

Telangana Legislative Assembly election, 2014

Andhra Pradesh Legislative Assembly election, 2009

See also
 List of constituencies of Telangana Legislative Assembly

References

Assembly constituencies of Telangana
Nirmal district